The 2004 UCI Cyclo-cross World Championships were held in Pont-Château, France on Saturday January 31 and Sunday February 1, 2004.

Medal summary

Medal table

Men's Elite
 Held on Sunday February 1, 2004

Men's Juniors
 Held on Saturday January 31, 2004

Men's Espoirs
 Held on Saturday January 31, 2004

Women's Elite
 Held on Sunday February 1, 2004

External links
 Sports123
 CyclingNews

UCI Cyclo-cross World Championships
World Championships
C
International sports competitions hosted by France
UCI Cyclo-cross World Championships 
UCI Cyclo-cross World Championships